Alexeyevka is a rural locality (a village) in Tolbazinsky Selsoviet, Aurgazinsky District, Bashkortostan, Russia. The population was 24 as of 2010.

Geography 
It is located 8 km from Tolbazy.

References 

Rural localities in Aurgazinsky District